Mar Ignatius Dionysius Ephrem II Rahmani (21 November 1848 – 7 May 1929) was Patriarch of the Syriac Catholic Church from 1898 to 1929 and a Syriac scholar.

Life
Ephrem Rahmani was born on 21 November 1848 (or on 9 November 1849 according to other sources) in Mosul. He studied with the Dominican friars in Mosul and later in the College of the Propaganda in Rome and was ordained priest in April 1873.

Rahmani was appointed vicar to the bishop of Mosul with the titular title of bishop of Edessa and consecrated bishop on 2 October 1887 by Patriarch Ignatius George V Shelhot. On 1 May 1894 Rahmani was appointed bishop of Aleppo. After the death of Ignatius Behnam II Benni (13 September 1897) he was elected Patriarch on 9 October 1898 and confirmed by Pope Leo XIII on 28 November 1898.

As patriarch Rahmani was particularly interested in the instruction of the clergy. The early 20th-century was a period of expansion for the Syriac Catholic Church who received many Syriac Orthodox converts. In 1910 he moved the Patriarchal See from Mardin to Beirut.

The arrival of World War I was catastrophic: the Armenian genocide brought destruction also to the Christian Syrians who lived in the same areas as the Armenians, with the result that the Syriac Catholic Church had the number of its members cut by half with five dioceses (of ten) and fifteen missions destroyed.

Ephrem Rahmani died in Cairo on 7 May 1929.

Works
Ephrem Rahmani was a liturgical scholar of international repute. In 1899 he discovered and published the first edition of the 4th-century text Testamentum Domini. His main contribution on the history of the liturgy is his book Les Liturgies Orientales et Occidentales, Beyrouth, 1929

Notes

Sources
 

Assyrians from the Ottoman Empire
Syriac Catholic Patriarchs of Antioch
1929 deaths
1848 births
People from Mosul
19th-century people from the Ottoman Empire
20th-century people from the Ottoman Empire
Bishops in the Ottoman Empire
19th-century Eastern Catholic archbishops
20th-century Eastern Catholic archbishops
Bishops of Edessa